The Prince Edward Island Real Estate Association (PEIREA) represents real estate brokers and salespeople in Prince Edward Island, Canada.

History
 1964 - incorporated as the PEI Real Estate Brokers Association
 1975 - changed name to the PEI Real Estate Association

See also
 Canadian Real Estate Association
 Multiple Listing Service

External links
 P.E.I. Real Estate Association

References

Real estate industry trade groups based in Canada
1964 establishments in Canada
Economy of Prince Edward Island